Mark Armstrong is an American college basketball player for the Villanova Wildcats of the Big East Conference.

Early life and high school
Armstrong grew up in South Orange, New Jersey and attended St. Peter's Preparatory School in Jersey City, New Jersey. He was a four-year starter on the basketball team and averaged 15.9 points per game as a freshman. Armstrong was named third team All-State after averaging 19.9 points per game during his sophomore season. He averaged 14.1 points, 2.4 rebounds, 2.7 assists, and 2.2 steals in eleven games during his junior season, which was shortened due to Covid-19. Armstrong was named the Hudson County Interscholastic League Player the Year as a senior after averaging 23.4 points, five rebounds, and 2.8 assists per game.

Armstrong was rated a four-star recruit and a consensus top-75 prospect by major recruiting services. He committed to play college basketball at Villanova over offers from Auburn, UConn, Louisville, Seton Hall, Rutgers, Stanford, and Kansas.

College career
Armstrong began his freshman season at Villanova as a key reserve. He started six of the team's seven games in December before returning to a backup role. He was named the Big East Conference Freshman of the Week after scoring 10 points on 3-of-4 shooting from the field in his first career start against Oklahoma. Armstrong was named to the Big East All-Freshman team at the end of the regular season.

National team career
Armstrong played for the United States under-18 basketball team at the 2022 FIBA Under-18 Americas Championship. He averaged 10.7 points, 3.7 rebounds, and 3.6 assists per game as the United States won the gold medal.

References

External links
USA Basketball bio
Villanova Wildcats bio

Living people
African-American basketball players
American men's basketball players
Basketball players from New Jersey
People from South Orange, New Jersey
Sportspeople from Essex County, New Jersey
St. Peter's Preparatory School alumni
Villanova Wildcats men's basketball players
Point guards
Year of birth missing (living people)